Constant Tamboucha (born 3 May 1976) is a Gabonese former footballer who played as a midfielder for FC 105 Libreville and Tout Puissant Akwembe. He made 24 appearances for the Gabon national team from 1995 to 2001. He was also named in Gabon's squad for the 1996 African Cup of Nations tournament.

References

External links
 

1976 births
Living people
Gabonese footballers
Association football midfielders
Gabon international footballers
1996 African Cup of Nations players
FC 105 Libreville players
Place of birth missing (living people)
21st-century Gabonese people